Tekla Sjöblom (21 July 1878 – 30 May 1967) was a Swedish actress. She appeared in more than 30 films between 1916 and 1961.

Selected filmography
 Thomas Graal's Ward (1922)
 Sealed Lips (1927)
 Modern Wives (1932)
 The People of Högbogården (1939)
 Scanian Guerilla (1941)
 The Forest Is Our Heritage (1944)
 Count Only the Happy Moments (1944)
 Black Roses (1945)
 Crime and Punishment (1945)
 Lars Hård (1948)
 Sir Arne's Treasure (1954)
 Woman in a Fur Coat (1958)
 Lovely Is the Summer Night (1961)

References

External links

1878 births
1967 deaths
Swedish film actresses
Actresses from Stockholm